The Three Rivers Classic is a two-day Division I college ice hockey tournament which is held annually at PPG Paints Arena, in Pittsburgh, Pennsylvania. The inaugural tournament took place on December 28–29, 2012 and featured teams from Miami University, Ohio State University, Pennsylvania State University and Robert Morris University. The second tournament was played out on December 27–28, 2013 and featured Penn State, Robert Morris, Boston College and Bowling Green State University. The Classic is the evolution of a showcase of games that the Robert Morris Colonials have played against the Ohio State Buckeyes and Miami RedHawks at either Consol Energy Center or Mellon Arena in previous years.

Yearly results

2018–19
The 2018 Tournament was held in January 2019 due to conflicts with the availability of PPG Paints Arena.

2017

2016
Consolation game between Ferris State and BC was decided in a shootout for the tournament, however the game was officially a tie. BC def. Ferris in the shootout 2-1

2015

2014
On Day 1 (December 29), the Colgate Raiders defeated the Western Michigan Broncos 2-1, and the Robert Morris Colonials beat the Penn State Nittany Lions by a margin of 4-2.

On Day 2 (December 30), in the consolation game, the Western Michigan Broncos beat the Penn State Nittany Lions 4-1. In the championship game the Colgate Raiders beat the Robert Morris Colonials 6-1, to win their first title.

2013
On Day 1 (December 27), the Boston College Eagles beat the Bowling Green Falcons 5-0, and the Penn State Nittany Lions beat the Robert Morris Colonials 3-2.

On Day 2 (December 28), in the consolation game the Bowling Green Falcons beat the Robert Morris Colonials 3-2. In the championship game the Boston College Eagles beat the Penn State Nittany Lions 8-2, to win its first title.

2012
On Day 1 (December 28), the Robert Morris Colonials beat Penn State Nittany Lions 6-0, and the Miami RedHawks beat the Ohio State Buckeyes 1-0.

On Day 2 (December 29), in the consolation game, the Penn State beat the Ohio State Buckeyes 5-4. In the championship game, the Robert Morris Colonials beat the Miami RedHawks 1-0, to win their first title.

Attendance
The total attendance for the inaugural games held on December 28 was listed as 11,663, while 10,797 turned out for the next day's games. The attendance total of 22,460 exceeded what had been hoped for by the event's planners, who estimated only 5,000 - 6,000 fans for each day of the games. The inaugural Classic also took part during the 2012–13 NHL lockout, which may have helped increase interest in the event.

References

2012 establishments in Pennsylvania
Ice hockey competitions in Pittsburgh
College ice hockey tournaments in the United States
Penn State Nittany Lions men's ice hockey
Robert Morris Colonials men's ice hockey